Sporadoceratinae is one of two subfamilies of the Sporadoceratidae family, a member of the Goniatitida order. It is an extinct group of ammonoid, which are shelled cephalopods related to squids, belemnites, octopuses and cuttlefish, and more distantly to the nautiloids.

References
 The Paleobiology Database accessed on 1 October 2007

Sporadoceratidae